Polja is a small town in the municipality of Mojkovac, Montenegro.

Demographics
According to the 2003 census, the town has a population of 1,506 people.

According to the 2011 census, its population was 1,281.

References

Populated places in Mojkovac Municipality